This article is about the particular significance of the year 1982 to Wales and its people.

Incumbents

Secretary of State for Wales – Nicholas Edwards
Archbishop of Wales – Gwilym Williams, Bishop of Bangor (retired)
Archdruid of the National Eisteddfod of Wales – Jâms Nicholas

Events
2 January – The Welsh Army of Workers claims responsibility for a bomb explosion at the Birmingham headquarters of Severn Trent Water.
May – Swansea City complete their first season in the English Football League First Division with a sixth-place finish.
2 June – 100,000 people gather in Pontcanna Fields, Cardiff, to welcome Pope John Paul II on the first-ever papal visit to Wales.
8 June – 32 men from the Welsh Guards are killed when the Sir Galahad burns during the Falklands War. The most famous of the survivors is Simon Weston, who is severely burned.
16 June – Welsh miners go on strike to support health workers demanding a 12% pay rise.
30 August – St David's Hall opens in Cardiff.
11 September – 14 skydivers from Wales die when a Chinook helicopter crashes at an airshow in Mannheim in Germany. 
16 September – At the Gower by-election brought about by the death of Ifor Davies, Gareth Wardell holds the seat for Labour.
17 October – First issue of Sulyn, the first Sunday newspaper in the Welsh language.
26 November – A plaque is unveiled by the Prince of Wales at the monument erected in memory of those who died in the Gresford Disaster of 1934.
date unknown
The Inmos microprocessor factory in Newport, Wales, designed by the Richard Rogers Partnership, is completed.
Swansea is given the right to have a Lord Mayor. Councillor Paul Valerio becomes the first incumbent.
First students begin courses at the Welsh language study centre at Nant Gwrtheyrn.

Arts and literature
Roger Rees wins a Tony Award for Best Actor in a Play for his performance in The Life and Adventures of Nicholas Nickleby.
Alice Thomas Ellis is shortlisted for the Booker Prize for The 27th Kingdom.

Awards
National Eisteddfod of Wales (held in Swansea)
National Eisteddfod of Wales: Chair - Gerallt Lloyd Owen
National Eisteddfod of Wales: Crown - Eirwyn George
National Eisteddfod of Wales: Prose Medal - Gwilym M. Jones

New books
Gwynfor Evans - Bywyd Cymro
Alun Jones - Pan Ddaw'r Machlud
R. Merfyn Jones - The North Wales Quarrymen 1874-1922
Rhiannon Davies Jones - Eryr Pengwern
Kenneth O. Morgan - Rebirth of a Nation: Wales 1880-1980
Wynford Vaughan-Thomas - Princes of Wales

Music
John Cale - Music For A New Society (album)
Dafydd Iwan with Ar Log - Rhwng Hwyl a Thaith

Film
Political Annie’s Off Again, film of a local industrial dispute made by Chapter Video Workshop.

Broadcasting

Welsh-language television
Cefn Gwlad
Joni Jones
Noson Lawen appears for the first time.
S4C starts broadcasting on 1 November

English-language television
The Citadel (BBC), filmed in Tredegar.

Sport
BBC Wales Sports Personality of the Year – Steve Barry
Boxing
 14 September – Kelvin Smart becomes British flyweight champion after beating fellow Welsh fighter Dave George.
Darts – Ann-Marie Davies wins the Women's World Masters Championship.
Snooker
 13 January – Terry Griffiths wins the Lada Classic.
 4 December – Terry Griffiths wins the UK Snooker Championship, to complete his career Triple Crown (snooker).
 Terry Parsons wins the World Amateur Championship.

Births
9 January – Catherine Middleton, future Princess of Wales (in England)
1 February – Gavin Henson, rugby player
4 February – Kevin Gall, footballer
2 May – Timothy Benjamin, athlete
12 May – David Thaxton, actor and singer
21 June – Prince William, first child of the Prince and Princess of Wales (in London)
29 August – Mike Phillips, rugby player
2 September – Matthew Rees, footballer
29 November – Imogen Thomas, model
25 December – Rob Edwards, footballer
date unknown – Amanda Hale, actress

Deaths
5 January – Jeanetta Thomas, UK's oldest person and oldest Welsh-born woman of all time, 112
11 January – Ronald Lewis, actor, 53
5 February – Ronald Welch, historical novelist, 72
8 February – Cedric Morris, artist, 92
6 May – Jennie Eirian Davies, politician and magazine editor
19 May – Elwyn Jones, television writer, 58
31 May – Eryl Davies, educationist, 59
6 June – Ifor Davies, politician, 71
10 July
Gwilym Jenkins (in Lancaster), statistician and systems engineer, 49
Gwilym Ellis Lane Owen, philosopher, 60
17 July – Bob John, footballer, 83
16 August – Sydney Hinam, Wales international rugby player, 83
18 October – Idwal Jones, politician, 82
19 October – Iorwerth Peate, social anthropologist and poet, founder of St Fagans National Museum of History, 81
4 November – Talfryn Thomas, character actor, 60
16 November – Ivor Jones, rugby union international, 80
19 November – Herbie Evans, footballer, 88
4 December – Ivor Williams, portrait painter, 74

See also 
 1982 in Northern Ireland

References 

 
 Wales